This is a list of broadcast television stations that are licensed in the U.S. state of Illinois.

Full-power stations
VC refers to the station's PSIP virtual channel. RF refers to the station's physical RF channel.

Defunct full-power stations
Channel 14: WJJY-TV – ABC – Jacksonville (1969–1971)
Channel 15: WBLN – Bloomington (12/1/1953-2/7/1957 and 12/1/1957-6/5/1958) – not the 1982 WBLN that became WYZZ-TV
Channel 20: WXXW – PBS – Chicago (9/20/1965-1974)
Channel 23: WIFR – CBS – Freeport/Rockford (1965–2017)
Channel 24: WICD – NBC – Danville (12/19/1953-8/14/1967)
Channel 25: WYCC – FNX – Chicago
Channel 35: WEEQ – NBC – LaSalle (11/7/1957-1973?) – relayed WEEK-TV

LPTV stations

Translators

See also

 Chicagoland Television
 Chicago Access Network Television
 Comcast SportsNet Chicago
 FSN Chicago
 Sportsvision
 List of Spanish-language television networks in the United States

References

External links
 
  (Directory ceased in 2017)
 Illinois Broadcasters Association
 
 
 
 
 
 

Illinois

Television stations